The Best of Odetta is a compilation album by American folk singer Odetta, released in 1967.

Track listing
"Muleskinner Blues" – 2:50	
"If I Had a Ribbon Bow" – 2:50	
"Shame and Scandal" – 2:25	
"'Buked and Scorned" – 2:40	
"Joshua" – 1:50	
"He's Got the Whole World in His Hands" – 1:50	
"Glory, Glory" – 2:10	
"Lowlands" – 2:35	
"The Fox" – 1:50	
"Lass of the Low Countrie" – 4:30	
"Devilish Mary" – 1:45	
"Take This Hammer" – 3:32

Personnel
Odetta – vocals, guitar
Bill Lee – bass

References

Odetta compilation albums
1967 greatest hits albums
Tradition Records compilation albums